Sir Charles Montagu (c. 1564 – 11 September 1625) of Cranbrook Hall in the parish of Barking, Essex, was an English politician who sat in the House of Commons from 1614 to 1625.

Montagu was one of the eight sons of Sir Edward Montagu of Boughton House in Northamptonshire by his wife Elizabeth Harington, a daughter of James Harington of Exton, Rutland and Lucy Sidney. Among his brothers were Edward Montagu, 1st Baron Montagu of Boughton, ancestor of Montagu, Dukes of Montagu; Henry Montagu, 1st Earl of Manchester, ancestor of Montagu, Dukes of Manchester and Montagu, Earls of Halifax and Sir Sidney Montagu, ancestor of Montagu, Earls of Sandwich. He was knighted at York or at Grimston Park on 18 April 1603.

He was elected as a Member of Parliament for Harwich in 1614, after Sir Robert Mansell was elected for two constituencies, and chose to sit for another. Montagu sat until 1620.

In 1621, he was elected as an MP for Higham Ferrers. He was re-elected MP for Higham Ferrers in 1624 and 1625.
 
Montagu died at the age of 61 and was buried in St Margaret's Church, Barking where survives his mural monument depicting a small effigy of Sir Charles fully armed, sitting in a military tent during a campaign. Inscribed as follows:
Heere lieth the body of ye worthy knight Sr Charles Montagu who died at his house at Cranbrook in Essex in the parish of Barking the 11th of September in ye yeere of our Lorde God 1625 being of ye age of 61 yeares who gave to ye poore of Barking forty pounds

Marriage and issue
Montagu married Mary Whitmore, a daughter of William Whitmore Esq. (d.1593), Haberdasher, an Alderman of London, often erroneously stated to have been Sir William Whitmore, by whom he had three daughters and co-heiresses, including:
Elizabeth Montagu (d. 1672), eldest daughter, who married Christopher Hatton, 1st Baron Hatton; 
the wife of Sir Edward Bysshe ;
Anne Montagu, who married Dudley North, 4th Baron North.

References

External links
Image of monument to Sir Charles Montagu

1560s births
1625 deaths
English MPs 1614
English MPs 1621–1622
English MPs 1624–1625
English MPs 1625
Charles